Governor Hawkins may refer to:

Alvin Hawkins (1821–1905), 22nd Governor of Tennessee
William Hawkins (governor) (1777–1819), 17th Governor of North Carolina